The work-wear brand Le Mont St Michel was launched in 1913, just a few miles away from the famous abbey after which it was named.

Company history
In 1920, Caroline Lesaffre founded a textile company in Wizernes (Pas-de-Calais), "Les Tricotages de l'Aa", which combined a factory with a school for young women whose fathers, brothers and husbands had not returned from World War I.
 
In 1964, Patrice Milan, Lessafre's grandson, took the reins of the company and modernised it by installing high-performance knitting machines. A lover of French country estates, he bought the Chateau de Monthorin. The Tricotages de l'Aa continued to prosper by manufacturing for well-known designers such as agnès b., Gerard Darel and Joseph.

In 1998, Alexandre Milan, succeeded his father as head of the company, acquired the tradename Le Mont Saint-Michel, combined the two companies and created a new brand under the Le Mont Saint-Michel name.

References

External links
 Site Officiel
 Collaboration Le Mont Saint Michel et Das Pop
 Hope Hope
 La maille emballe la mode
 Le Mont St Michel, maille made in France

Clothing brands
Clothing companies of France
French brands